John Lawton (c.1700 – 7 June 1740) was a British Member of Parliament (MP).

He was elected at the 1734 general election as an MP for Newcastle-under-Lyme,
and held the seat until his death in 1740.

References 

1700 births
1740 deaths
Members of the Parliament of Great Britain for Newcastle-under-Lyme
British MPs 1734–1741